Thomas Denis (born 18 July 1997) is a French track and road cyclist, who currently rides for UCI Continental team . Representing France at international competitions, Denis won the gold medal at the 2016 UEC European Track Championships in the team pursuit.

Major results

Track

2014
 National Championships
2nd Team pursuit
3rd Madison
2015
 National Championships
1st  Individual pursuit
2nd Kilo
2nd Team pursuit
 2nd  Individual pursuit, UEC European Under-23 Championships
2016
 1st  Team pursuit, UEC European Championships
 UEC European Under-23 Championships
1st  Team pursuit
3rd  Individual pursuit
 2nd Scratch race, UCI World Cup, Los Angeles
 National Championships
2nd Team pursuit
3rd Individual pursuit
2017
 1st  Team pursuit, UEC European Championships
 National Championships
1st  Team pursuit
2nd Madison
2nd Omnium
 3rd Team pursuit,, UCI World Cup, Manchester
2019
 UCI World Cup
1st Team pursuit, Milton
2nd Team pursuit, Minsk
3rd Team pursuit, Glasgow
 National Championships
1st  Team pursuit
2nd Individual pursuit
 2nd  Madison (with Donavan Grondin), UEC European Under-23 Championships
2021
 National Championships
1st  Madison (with Valentin Tabellion)
2nd Team pursuit
 2nd  Team pursuit, UCI World Championships
2023
 3rd  Team pursuit, UEC European Championships

Road
2014
 2nd Chrono des Nations Juniors
2015
 3rd Chrono des Nations Juniors
 10th Overall Trophée Centre Morbihan
2017
 4th Time trial, National Under-23 Road Championships
2019
 2nd Time trial, National Under-23 Road Championships

References

External links

1997 births
Living people
French male cyclists
French track cyclists
Sportspeople from Morbihan
Cyclists from Brittany